HD 134060, also known by its Gould designation of 38 G. Circini, is a star in the southern constellation of Circinus. It is near the lower limit of stars visible to the naked eye, having an apparent visual magnitude of 6.29. It is moving further away with a heliocentric radial velocity of 43.5 km/s, having come within  some 439,000 years ago.

During the NStars project, Grey et al. However, an older classification of G3 IV is still used, which would suggest it is instead a more evolved subgiant star. HD 134060 has an estimated 1.07 times the mass of the Sun and 1.15 times the Sun's radius. It is radiating 1.63 times the Sun's luminosity from its photosphere at an effective temperature of about 5,965 K.

The survey in 2015 have ruled out the existence of any additional stellar companions at projected distances from 22 to 163 astronomical units.

Planetary system 

Based upon an 8-year survey using the HARPS spectrograph at La Silla Observatory, in 2011 the detection of a pair of planets orbiting this star were announced. The inner planet, HD 134060 b, is in a tight, eccentric orbit around the star with a period of just over three days.

The star was observed for a few hours by the Spitzer Space Telescope in the hopes of observing a transit by the inner planet, but none was detected. HD 134060 displays an infrared excess at a wavelength of 18μm, making it a warm debris disk candidate.

References

External links

G-type main-sequence stars
Planetary systems with two confirmed planets
Circinus (constellation)
Durchmusterung objects
Circini, 38
134060
074273